Wilfrid Hubert Ramsbotham (20 December 1888 – 7 November 1978) was an English cricketer.  Rambotham was a right-handed batsman.  He was born at Ipsden, Oxfordshire, and was educated at Uppingham School.

While studying at the University of Cambridge, Ramsbotham made his first-class debut for Cambridge University against Kent in 1908.  In that same season, he made his first-class debut for Sussex against Cambridge University, as well as making his County Championship against Hampshire in that same season.  The following season, he made his second and final first-class appearance for Cambridge University against the touring Australians.  For Sussex, he went on to make five further first-class appearances for the county, the last of which came against Oxford University in 1910.  In total, Rambotham made seven first-class appearances for Sussex, scoring 210 runs at an average of 19.09, with a high score of 56.  This score was his only first-class half century and came against Cambridge University in 1909.

He died at Kensington, London, on 7 November 1978.  His cousin, Richard Ramsbotham, also played first-class cricket.

References

External links
Wilfrid Ramsbotham at ESPNcricinfo
Wilfrid Ramsbotham at CricketArchive

1888 births
1978 deaths
People from South Oxfordshire District
People educated at Uppingham School
Alumni of the University of Cambridge
English cricketers
Cambridge University cricketers
Sussex cricketers